Prince of Peoria is an American teen sitcom, created by Nick Stanton and Devin Bunje, that premiered on November 16, 2018, on Netflix.

Premise
Prince of Peoria follows "Emil, a 13-year-old prince from a wealthy island kingdom" who "travels to the United States to live incognito as an exchange student" and "strikes up an unlikely friendship with Teddy, a fastidious overachiever who is Emil’s total opposite."

Cast and characters

Main
 Gavin Lewis as Prince Maxemil "Emil" Vanderklaut III, a prince from Buronia who plays a foreign exchange student
 Theodore Barnes as Teddy Jackson, a smart kid who cares more about his education than making friends
 Shelby Simmons as Sydney Quinn, Teddy's crush who discovers Emil's real identity and helps him keep it a secret
 Cynthia Kaye McWilliams as Regina Jackson, the owner of the Spare Time Bowl bowling alley and Teddy's widowed mother

Recurring
 Haley Tju as Braughner, Sydney's friend
 Gabriel Hogan as Joosep, Emil's bodyguard
 Conor Husting as Tanner, Sydney's ex-boyfriend
 Kyle More as Wade, an employee at Spare Time Bowl
 Johnathan McClain as King of Buronia
 Nate Torrence as Vice Principal Chipler
 Brooke Star as Autumn McCrary
 Chelsea Summer as Summer McCrary
 Zach Zagoria as Stank Man
 Jared Wernick as Daryl

Guest
 David Shatraw as Fabian La Fab ("A Night at the Hip Hopera")
 Ricardo Hurtado as Rafael ("The Bro-Posal")
 Tia Mowry as Meghan ("Game Night"), one of Sydney's moms who went to MIT
 Sophie Reynolds as Ryan Gibson ("Robot Wars"), Teddy's archenemy

Episodes

Production

Development
On January 31, 2018, it was announced that Netflix had given the production series order for a first season consisting of sixteen episodes. The series was created by Nick Stanton and Devin Bunje who will also act as writers, showrunners, and executive producers. Additional executive producers are set to include Sharla Sumpter Bridgett.

Casting
On April 2, 2018, it was announced that Gavin Lewis, Theodore Barnes, Shelby Simmons, and Cynthia Kaye McWilliams had joined the main cast.

References

External links
 
 

2010s American teen sitcoms
2018 American television series debuts
2019 American television series endings
English-language Netflix original programming
Monarchy in fiction
Television series about teenagers
Television shows set in Illinois
Works about princes
Television series about royalty